is a Japanese professional footballer. He is a flexible player, able to play in his natural role as defender, defensive midfielder, and plays for Thespakusatsu Gunma, and the Japan national team.

Club career
Hosogai was amongst the most promising players of Urawa Red Diamonds. Having helped the Red Diamonds to the AFC Champions League in 2007, he played for Urawa at the 2007 FIFA Club World Cup.

On 23 December 2010, he left Japan and transferred to the German club Bayer 04 Leverkusen, who promptly loaned him out to FC Augsburg. On 9 September 2011, he scored his first Bundesliga goal against Leverkusen. Playing for the newly promoted Bavarian club, Hosogai helped avoiding relegation before returning to Bayer Leverkusen for the 2012–13 season.

On 25 July 2016, Hosogai moved to VfB Stuttgart. He joined Kashiwa Reysol on 24 March 2017.

On 6 December 2018, it was confirmed that Hosogai would join the Thai league club Buriram United for the 2019 season.

On 12 December 2019, it was announced that Hosogai had joined club Bangkok United on a season-long loan deal.

International career
Hosogai has represented Japan at numerous youth levels. He was a member of the Japan team for the 2008 Summer Olympics finals, and made his debut for the Japan national team in a 1–0 win against Paraguay (playing in his natural role as central midfielder) at his home stadium in Saitama on 4 September 2010, after being called up for the first time by caretaker Hiromi Hara and under the auspices of new manager Alberto Zaccheroni.
He scored his first goal for the senior national team on 25 January 2011 in the 2011 AFC Asian Cup semi-final match against South Korea.

Career statistics

Club

1Includes Emperor's Cup and DFB-Pokal.

2Includes J. League Cup.

3Includes AFC Champions League and UEFA Europa League.

4Includes Japanese Super Cup, A3 Champions Cup and FIFA Club World Cup.

International

International goals
Scores and results list Japan's goal tally first.

Under-23

Senior team

Appearances in major competitions

Honours
Urawa Red Diamonds
AFC Champions League: 2007
J. League Division 1: 2006
Emperor's Cup: 2005, 2006
Japanese Super Cup: 2006

Japan
AFC Asian Cup: 2011

Individual
 Thai League 1 Player of the Month (1): February 2020

References

External links
 
 
 Japan National Football Team Database
 
 Profile at Kashiwa Reysol
 
 

Living people
1986 births
Association football people from Gunma Prefecture
Association football fullbacks
Association football midfielders
Japanese footballers
Japan international footballers
J1 League players
J2 League players
Bundesliga players
2. Bundesliga players
Süper Lig players
Urawa Red Diamonds players
FC Augsburg players
Bayer 04 Leverkusen players
Hertha BSC players
Bursaspor footballers
VfB Stuttgart players
Kashiwa Reysol players
Thespakusatsu Gunma players
Footballers at the 2006 Asian Games
Olympic footballers of Japan
Footballers at the 2008 Summer Olympics
2011 AFC Asian Cup players
AFC Asian Cup-winning players
2013 FIFA Confederations Cup players
Japanese expatriate footballers
Expatriate footballers in Germany
Expatriate footballers in Turkey
Japanese expatriate sportspeople in Germany
Japanese expatriate sportspeople in Turkey
Asian Games competitors for Japan